This is a list of airports (aerodromes and heliports) in Belgium, sorted by location.

Names shown in bold indicate airports with scheduled service on commercial airlines.

See also 
 Transport in Belgium
 Belgian Air Component
 List of airports by ICAO code: E#EB – Belgium
 Former aerodromes of Belgium
 Wikipedia:WikiProject Aviation/Airline destination lists: Europe#Belgium

Notes

References 

 
Airports
Belgium
Airports
Belgium